Oberland is a German term and means Highlands.

Consequently, it may refer to several places:

Germany
Oberland am Rennsteig, Sonneberg, Thuringia, Germany
Vogtländisches Oberland, Greiz, Thuringia, Germany
In East Prussia, the Elbląg Canal was named the Oberländischer Kanal (Oberland Canal)
Bavarian Oberland, the Oberland region in Bavaria

Switzerland 
Berner Oberland, canton of Bern, Switzerland
Zürcher Oberland, canton of Zürich, Switzerland
Canton of Oberland, a canton of the former Helvetic Republic (1798–1803)
Zürcher Oberländer, a Swiss newspaper established in 1870
Dampfbahn-Verein Zürcher Oberland, a heritage railway association in Zurich

Austria 
Tyrolean Oberland, fourth region of Tyrol

Hungary 
Oberlander Jews, who originate from the Oberland region of Hungary
Upper Hungary, Hungarian term for historical northern Hungary, now mostly  Slovakia

Liechtenstein 
Oberland (electoral district), meaning "upper land," is one of the two electoral districts of Liechtenstein

See also
Oberlander (disambiguation)
Overlanders (disambiguation)
Overland (disambiguation)
 Bündner Oberland
 Medels im Oberland
 Oberland League
Pircher Oberland, Italian company in sustainable timber construction, DIY and garden furnishings